Dissorophinae is a subfamily of dissorophid temnospondyls that includes Dissorophus and Broiliellus.

Phylogeny
Below is the cladogram from Schoch (2012):

References

Permian temnospondyls